The Assam Garden is a 1985 British drama film directed by Mary McMurray and produced by Nigel Stafford-Clark with Peter Jaques as associate producer. Made by Moving Picture Company and distributed by Contemporary Films Ltd., it was written by Elisabeth Bond. The music score was by Richard Harvey and the cinematography by Bryan Loftus.

The film stars Deborah Kerr and Madhur Jaffrey with Alec McCowen, Zia Mohyeddin, Anton Lesser and Iain Cuthbertson.

The film was shot at Priors Mesne in Aylburton, Gloucestershire, England. At certain times of the year the garden is opened as part of the NGS (Gardens open for Charity) Scheme. In addition part of the land owned by Priors Mesne and run by the owners is now a Deer Park.

Plot
The recently widowed and somewhat cold Mrs. Graham (Deborah Kerr) discovers that her late husband's expansive garden has been selected for consideration as a "Great British Garden".  Mrs Graham then devotes her days to tending the garden that her husband had devoted his life to, in the hopes of it being selected for this honour.  While gardening, Mrs. Graham encounters and develops a close friendship with her neighbor, Mrs. Lal.  Through working in the garden with Mrs. Lal, Mrs. Graham finds some joy and warmth in life.

However, Mrs. Lal is homesick for her native India and at the end of the film, returns to India, leaving Mrs. Graham alone again.  Mrs. Graham also learns that her husband left debts and she may be forced to sell her house and beloved garden, just when it looks like it has qualified for the Great British Garden list.  The film ends with Mrs. Graham standing alone in the garden calling to her late husband to not leave her.

Cast
 Deborah Kerr as Helen Graham
 Ronald Russell as Mr. Grace
 Daisy Bell as Elsie Edison
 Peggy Ann Wood as Mrs. Grace
 Iain Cuthbertson as Arthur
 Paul Bown as Water Board Man
 Madhur Jaffrey as Ruxmani
 Waseem Aziz as Vijay
 Zia Mohyeddin as Mr. Lal
 Alec McCowen as Mr. Philpott
 Paula Jacobs as Carol

Award nomination

References

External links

Gardens of Film Location open under NGS (national gardens Scheme)

1985 films
1985 drama films
British drama films
Films scored by Richard Harvey
1980s English-language films
1980s British films